The James Flack Norris Award is an award handed out yearly for "outstanding contributions to the field of chemical education". The award, which was established in 1950 and was handed out the first time in 1951 was created by the Northeastern Section of the American Chemical Society in memory of the contributions of James Flack Norris, professor of Chemistry at the Massachusetts Institute of Technology.

See also

 List of chemistry awards

References

External links 
 Official Website

Chemistry awards
Awards established in 1950
1950 establishments in the United States